Two Sisters is in the Absaroka Range in the U.S. state of Montana. The peak is located in Custer National Forest. Two Sisters consists of an east and west peak with the latter being the taller one.

References

Mountains of Stillwater County, Montana
Mountains of Montana